The Cossidae, the cossid millers or carpenter millers, make up a family of mostly large miller moths. This family contains over 110 genera with almost 700 known species, and many more species await description. Carpenter millers are nocturnal Lepidoptera found worldwide, except the Southeast Asian subfamily Ratardinae, which is mostly active during the day.

These moths are mostly grey; some have long, narrow wings and resemble hawkmoths (Sphingidae) which are more advanced macrolepidoptera, however. Many are twig, bark, or leaf mimics, and Cossidae often have some sort of large marking at the tip of the forewing uppersides, conspicuous in flight, but resembling a broken-off twig when the animals are resting.

Caterpillars are smooth with a few hairs. Most cossid caterpillars are tree borers, in some species taking up to three years to mature. The caterpillars pupate within their tunnels; they often have an unpleasant smell, hence another colloquial name is goat moths.

The family includes the carpenterworm (Prionoxystus robiniae) and the goat moth (Cossus cossus) which have gained popularity as pests. However, the large caterpillars of species that do not smell badly are often edible. Witchetty grubs – among the Outback's most famous bush tucker – are most commonly the caterpillars of Endoxyla leucomochla, one of the more than 80 cossid species in Australia. In Chile, the sweet-smelling caterpillars of the Chilean moth (Chilecomadia moorei) are harvested in quantity and internationally traded as butterworms, for use as pet food and fishing bait.

Systematics
Some other animal families, such as the Dudgeoneidae, Metarbelidae, and Ratardidae, have been included within this family time and again. The first is considered a distinct family of the Cossoidea today recognizable by their abdominal tympanal organs which the Cossidae lack, whereas the other two are usually kept in the Cossidae as subfamilies. Some unrelated millers were included in the Cossidae in error, too, such as the genus Holcoceroides which is more primitive Ditrysia, or the Andesianidae which are even more ancient Heteroneura.

The Cossidae were usually divided into six subfamilies. However, numerous new subfamilies have been described recently, the current taxonomy is:

Subfamily Catoptinae
Subfamily Chilecomadiinae
Subfamily Cossinae
Subfamily Cossulinae
Subfamily Hypoptinae
Subfamily Mehariinae
Subfamily Metarbelinae (disputed)
Subfamily Politzariellinae
Subfamily Pseudocossinae
Subfamily Ratardinae (disputed)
Subfamily Stygiinae
Subfamily Zeuzerinae

Genera Incertae sedis:

 Acritocera
 Anastomophleps
 Archaeoses
 Charmoses
 Dolecta
 Eusthenica (or in Glyphipterigidae)
 †Gurnetia
 Huayna
 Psychidarbela
 Ptilomacra
 Schausiania

Excluded genera
 Moth genera now included in Dudgeoneidae
 †Achthina
 Nomima
 Theatrista
 Moth genera now included in Psychidae
 Adelopsyche
 Degia
 Hemilipia
 Mekla
 Trigonocyttara
 Westia
 Other 
 Pecticossus
 Phragmatoecioides
 Pseudurgis
 Synaptophleps
 †Xyleutites

References

Further reading

External links

Flickr Cossidae

 
Moth families